Fernand Cortez, ou La conquête du Mexique  (Hernán Cortés, or The Conquest of Mexico) is an opera in three acts by Gaspare Spontini with a French libretto by Étienne de Jouy and Joseph-Alphonse Esménard. It was first performed on 28 November 1809 by the Académie Impériale de Musique (Paris Opera) at the Salle Montansier.

Background and performance history
The opera was originally intended as political propaganda to support the Emperor Napoleon's invasion of Spain in 1808. Cortez symbolises Napoleon while the bloodthirsty Aztec priests are meant to represent the Spanish Inquisition. The emperor himself is said to have suggested the theme of the opera to Spontini and the premiere was held in his presence. The popularity of the piece declined with the waning of the French army's fortunes in Spain and Portugal.
 
The 1809 premiere was famous for its spectacular effects, including the appearance of 17 live horses on stage. Critics complained about the adventurous harmony and the loudness of the music. The richness of the staging, extensive use of dance and the treatment of an historical subject make Spontini's work the precursor of French Grand Opera. It was greatly admired by Hector Berlioz.

Spontini substantially revised twice the opera for revivals in Paris on 28 May 1817. Revisions were also made for performances in Berlin in 1824 (recorded by Jean-Paul Penin in 1999) and 1832, and later in Paris in 1838, last version of the work. Performances in Paris at Saint-Louis des Invalides, with the sponsorship of the Fondation Napoléon, in Madrid (Auditorio Nacional), Oviedo and Sevilla, 2003, with the Prag Radio Philharmonic, then at the Theater Erfurt in 2006, all series conducted by Penin.

Roles

Synopsis
This is based on the original version of 1809.

Act 1
The opera is based on the story of the Spanish conquistador, Hernán Cortés, and his invasion of Aztec Mexico. At the beginning of the opera, Cortez persuades his mutinous troops not to embark for home. His brother, Alvaro, is a prisoner of the Aztecs and Cortez is also in love with the Aztec princess, Amazily. Amazily's brother, Télasco, arrives and tells the Spaniards to leave Mexico. Cortez responds by setting fire to his own ships.

Act 2
The Spaniards advance on the Aztec temple with Télasco their prisoner. They succeed in freeing Alvaro. Télasco accuses his sister Amazily of being a traitor and the Aztecs threaten to behead her if Alvaro is not returned to them. Amazily decides to sacrifice herself and hands herself over to the Aztecs. Cortez orders his men to attack the temple.

Act 3
In the temple, the priests prepare to sacrifice Alvaro when Amazily arrives. An oracle from the god announces that he wants the blood of his enemies. News arrives that the Aztec emperor Montezuma has been captured by the Spaniards. The high priest decides to go ahead with the sacrifice of Amazily. The Spaniards arrive just in time to save her. Amazily and Cortez are united in marriage.

Recordings
(1817 version) Soloists, Slovak National Philharmonic Choir, Slovak National Philharmonic Orchestra conducted by Jean-Paul Penin (Accord, 1999)
With Dario Schmunck, Alexia Voulgaridou, Luca Lombardo, Gianluca Margheri, David Ferri Durà, Orchestra and chorus of the Maggio Musicale Fiorentino conducted by Jean-Luc Tingaud. CD: Dynamic Cat:CDS7868. Released 2020.

References
Notes

Sources
Original libretto: Fernand Cortez ou La Conquête du Mexique, Opéra en 3 Actes, Représenté pour le première Fois, sur le Théâtre de l'Académie Imperiale de Musique, le 28 novembre 1809, Paris, Roullet, 1809 (accessible for free online at Gallica – BNF)
Original printed score: Fernand Cortez ou La Conquête du Mexique, Tragédie Lyrique en 3 Actes de MM De Jouy et Esmenard; Mise en Musique et Dediée à Sa Majesté La Reine des Deux Siciles par Gasparo Spontini, Paris, Imbault, 1809(?) (accessible for free online at Harvard University Library)
Printed score of the 1817 edition: Fernand Cortez ou La conquête du Méxique, Tragédie Lyrique en 3 Actes de MM. De Jouy et Esmenard; Mise en Musique et Dédiée à Son Excellence Monsieur le Comte de Pradel... par G. Spontini (représentée pour la première fois sur le théâtre de l'Académie royale de musique le 28 novembre 1809 et remise avec des changemens, le 28 mai 1817; nouvelle édition), Paris, Hanry, ca 1817 (accessible for free online at Gallica – BNF)

Further reading
Holden, Amanda (ed.), The New Penguin Opera Guide, New York: Penguin Putnam, 2001. 
Del Teatro (in Italian)
 Faul, Michel, Les aventures militaires, littéraires et autres d'Étienne de Jouy, Éditions Seguier, France, 2009.

External links

 About Étienne de Jouy who wrote Fernand Cortez and other libretti such as La vestale 
 

Operas by Gaspare Spontini
French-language operas
1809 operas
Operas set in Mexico
Operas
Aztecs in fiction